John Holmes Agnew (4 May 1804 — 1865) was the first editor of The Eclectic Magazine, a professor of ancient languages at the University of Michigan and a member of the Presbyterian clergy.

References 

1804 births
1865 deaths
American classical scholars
University of Michigan faculty